Långholmen FC is a Swedish football club based in Långholmen, Stockholm.

Background
Långholmen Football Club was formed in 2002 by a dozen or so English-speaking exiles looking for exercise and a chance to show their ability on a Saturday afternoon.

The club is now an important part of the sporting and social life of the expatriate community in Stockholm with well over a hundred members. Since 2002 their teams have won five championships, eleven promotions and the Stockholm Korpen champions trophy. Their first team has climbed steadily up the Stockholm leagues.

In 2010 they made it to the national league system and played in Division Three – a remarkable achievement for such a young club. However, 2011 saw them in Division Four again.

In total, LFC have eight teams: six men's and two women's; regular structured training; casual kickabouts, a lively social network and a growing fan base.

They won an international tournament in Berlin and have hosted matches in Stockholm to their international friends, for instance they have played the Royal Household Staff team from London, England and in 2010 the Tartan Army team before the Scotland-Sweden match plus the Royal Epsom team from the UK.

In 2011, Långholmen reached the final of the Stockholm Cup but ended up runners up after a defeat by Sollentuna FC in the final (7–4). Nevertheless, this achievement meant they were then placed in the rounds of the Swedish Cup and, after defeating more opponents in earlier rounds, they were then drawn against IFK Göteborg, Sweden's most successful club ever (who have won 18 national championship titles, five national cup titles, and two UEFA Cups) in the next Svenska Cupen. This match was played on 20 August 2012 at Grimsta IP and without a doubt the biggest day ever in the club's history and one that created mass media hype both in Sweden and abroad with major newspapers (Guardian, La Stampa, DN to name but a few), TV, radio stations and websites spreading the news – the David v Goliath romance of football. The match ended with a 9–0 defeat but the celebrations at the end by the home team and fans seemed like LFC had actually won. The team, club and fans (687) were extremely proud of this historic match.

Although English is generally the main language used by Långholmen players and the majority of members have tended to be from the British Isles, the club has always been proud of its international mix of players having had 68 different nationalities play for them since their humble beginnings.

Långholmen FC are affiliated to the Stockholms Fotbollförbund. In a decision with some parallels to the landmark Bosman ruling, the Swedish Football Association granted Långholmen FC a temporary dispensation for the 2010 season from regulations requiring a quota of Sweden-bred players in match day squads. The club appealed because they had only five players who qualified as homegrown players.

Season to season

* League restructuring in 2006 resulted in a new division being created at Tier 3 and subsequent divisions dropping a level.

|}

Honours 
Division 4
 Champions 2009
Division 5
 Champions 2014 & 2016
 Runners-up 2007
Division 7
 Champions 2005
Stockholm Cup
 Runners-up 2011

Attendances

In recent seasons Långholmen FC have had the following average attendances:

Footnotes

External links
 Långholmen FC – Official website
 Långholmen FC Facebook
 Stripe News – Långholmen FC Blog
 Twitter feed
 Instagram
 YouTube channel

Football clubs in Stockholm
Association football clubs established in 2002
2002 establishments in Sweden